Elisabeth 'Liesbeth' Tuijnman (born 7 July 1943, Middelburg) is the current mayor of the municipality of Overbetuwe in the Netherlands. She obtained the equivalent of a bachelor's degree in education. Before becoming mayor of Overbetuwe, she had served as mayor to the rural community of Norg, Papendrecht and Sandebuur. Mayor Tuijnman is a member of the liberal conservative People's Party for Freedom and Democracy.

References 
 Expositie Elisabeth Tuijnman, Blixem Winkel Lunchcafé

External links 
 Mayor Liesbeth Tuijnman (with photo), municipality of Overbetuwe

1943 births
Living people
Dutch civil servants
Mayors in Gelderland
People from Overbetuwe
Mayors in South Holland
People from Papendrecht
People from Middelburg, Zeeland
People's Party for Freedom and Democracy politicians
Women mayors of places in the Netherlands